Daniel Duchaine (1952 – January 12, 2000) was an American bodybuilder. Nicknamed the steroid guru, Duchaine gained worldwide notoriety due to his outspoken opinions on the use of performance-enhancing drugs, and made numerous television appearances discussing the subject on shows such as 20/20, Geraldo, and 60 Minutes. Steroid Nation author and ESPN writer Shaun Assael calls Duchaine "a founding father of the steroid movement." Duchaine was a low-carbohydrate diet advocate and promoted his own diet, the "Bodyopus diet".

Duchaine and steroids 
Duchaine began competitive bodybuilding in his home state of Maine in 1977; however, after he had no luck (describing himself as a "miserable bodybuilder"), he began using anabolic steroids that he persuaded his family physician in Portland to prescribe as a training aid. However, after beginning their use he said "I still wasn't very good. Obviously something wasn't working, and the doctors and the pharmacists couldn't really answer my questions. So I started looking into steroids on my own." This was the start of the quest for knowledge that would eventually land him the title of "Guru" on the subject. He moved to Los Angeles in 1978.

In mid-1987, Duchaine was caught and indicted on conspiracy and mislabeling charges. He pleaded guilty to the two counts and was sentenced to a maximum of three years in federal prison with five years of probation by Judge J. Lawrence Irving of San Diego Federal Court. In November 1988 Duchaine was profiled by The New York Times on its front page as part of an Olympics-inspired series on steroids in sports.

Duchaine was released after ten months. In 1991, while still on probation he met up with a friend who was selling gamma-hydroxybutyrate (commonly known as GHB) and began working with him. One of their customers, however, was an undercover Food and Drug Administration (FDA) agent, and Duchaine was convicted a second time and sentenced to 36 months in prison. While in prison, he says he learned to make money through "legitimate avenues".

In 1988, Duchaine introduced Clenbuterol to bodybuilders. Duchaine is also credited with introducing 2,4-Dinitrophenol (DNP) into bodybuilding through an interview on one of ten cassettes included with bodybuilding magazine Muscle Media 2000. In 2007 Duchaine was featured prominently in the book Steroid Nation by ESPN writer Shaun Assael.

Writing career 

First published in 1981, The Underground Steroid Handbook was an 18-page pamphlet which focused on bodybuilders who used the drugs for competition, defines the different types of steroids and explains what they look like, what they should cost, where to get them and how to use them. After placing ads in fitness and martial-arts magazines, as well as Soldier of Fortune, he printed and sold between 40,000 and 50,000 copies of the Underground Steroid Handbook at $6 a copy, over a four-year period. In 1988 Robert Voy, the chief medical officer of the United States Olympic Committee called it "a fabulous pharmacological text." The New York Times reported that both Voy and Don Catlin of UCLA, who did most of the drug tests for the United States Olympic Committee and the National Collegiate Athletic Association in the 1980s had the book in their files.

In 1992 after being released from prison for a second time Duchaine began working for Bill Phillips' Muscle Media 2000 magazine writing a monthly Q&A column called "Ask the Guru". By this time Duchaine had published several books in his Underground Steroid Handbook series (co-authored with Michael Zumpano), and referred to himself as a Human Performance Theorist.

Duchaine was a low-carbohydrate diet advocate. In his 1996 book Underground Bodyopus: Militant Weight Loss & Recomposition, Duchaine advocated a ketogenic diet known as the "Bodyopus diet".

Death
Duchaine was found dead on January 12, 2000, by his close friend Shelley Hominuk in his apartment in Carlsbad, California. Cause of death was complications resulting from polycystic kidney disease.

Quotes 
 "If you can't grow on Deca and Dbol, you can't grow on anything!" – taken from Duchaine's Dirty Dieting Newsletter in 1997

Duchaine's books 
 Duchaine, Dan. The Original Underground Steroid Handbook, 1981
 Duchaine, Dan. Underground Steroid Handbook, 1983
 Duchaine, Dan. Underground Steroid Handbook II HLR Technical Books, 1988.
 Duchaine, Dan. Underground Body Opus: Militant Weight Loss & Recomposition XIPE Press, March 1996.

See also 
Experimental and Applied Sciences

References

External links 
Dan Duchaine at qfac.com

1952 births
2000 deaths
20th-century American criminals
20th-century American non-fiction writers
American bodybuilders
Low-carbohydrate diet advocates
People from Carlsbad, California
Sportspeople from California
Writers from California